Pollenia sichuanensis is a species of cluster fly in the family Polleniidae.

Distribution
China.

References

Polleniidae
Insects described in 2004
Diptera of Asia